Sprint cars are high-powered open-wheel race cars, designed primarily for the purpose of running on short oval or circular dirt or paved tracks. Sprint car racing is popular primarily in the United States and Canada, as well as in Australia, New Zealand, and South Africa.

Typically, they are powered by a naturally aspirated, methanol-injected overhead valve American V8 engine with a displacement of 410 cubic inches (6.7L) and capable of engine speeds of 9000 rpm. A lower-budget and very popular class of sprint cars uses 360-cubic-inch (5.9L) engines that produce up to 775 horsepower. Sprint cars do not utilize a transmission but have an in-or-out gearbox and quick-change rear differentials for occasional gearing changes. As a result, they do not have electric starters (or even electrical systems other than a ignition magneto) and require a push to be started. The safety record of sprint car racing in recent years has been greatly improved by the use of roll cages, and especially on dirt tracks, wings, which increase surface traction, to protect the drivers.

Many IndyCar Series and NASCAR drivers used sprint car racing as an intermediate stepping stone on their way to more high-profile divisions, including Indianapolis 500 winners  A. J. Foyt, Mario Andretti, Johnny Rutherford, Parnelli Jones, Johnnie Parsons, Al Unser Sr., and Al Unser Jr., as well as NASCAR Cup Series champions Jeff Gordon , Tony Stewart and Kyle Larson.

The National Sprint Car Hall of Fame & Museum, located in Knoxville, Iowa, features exhibits highlighting the history of both winged and wingless sprint cars.

Engine

Wingless sprint cars

There are several sanctioning bodies for wingless sprint cars. Once dominant United States Automobile Club (USAC) became USAC/California Racing Association (USAC/CRA) after taking over the Sprint Car Racing Association (SCRA). USAC/CRA remains popular on the West Coast, East Coast and in Indiana.    However, lack of leadership in much of the US has resulted in a large number of groups and sanctioning bodies supporting wingless sprint cars.

Wingless sprint cars are considered the traditional sprint cars, dating back to the first sprint cars in the 1930s and 1940s (that ultimately evolved into Indy cars). Today, they are essentially the same car as a winged sprint car, only without wings. In fact, many of them have the "stub outs" in the frame for adding wings. They generally use the same  and  aluminum engines as their winged counterparts (although many local tracks have rules mandating steel blocks and some  displacements, this is mostly a cost control). Some newer regional groups, specifically POWRi and Elite have chosen to allow open engines with no limit to engine size. Their tuning and gearing are different for performance at lower RPMs than winged cars. Chassis set ups and tires are also different.  

While they do not have the same top speed as a winged car (because they lack downforce for traction), they are thought by many to be more entertaining to watch. Their relative lack of grip creates different driving characteristics than their winged counterparts, causing them to be more difficult to control through the corners. This, and the lack of roll-over protection a wing provides, makes them more dangerous than winged cars and their crashes are known for their spectacular nature.

Winged sprint cars

The world's first small-track winged race car was driven by Jim Cushman at the Columbus Motor Speedway (Ohio) in 1958. Cushman drove with his winged super-modified (wing created by Gene and Floyd Miller) in several races and even won with it, starting a new trend of winged cars in sprint and super-modified racing. By 1959, up to half of the field was racing with a wing at Columbus Motor Speedway.  In the early 1970s, many sprint car drivers began to put wings with sideboards on both the front and top of their cars. The added wings increase the downforce generated on the car, with the opposite direction of the sideboards helping to turn the car in the corners. The increased traction makes the car faster and easier to control.

The wing also affects safety. The added downforce lessens the likelihood of going airborne. When cars do go airborne, the wings contact the ground first and break off or crumple upon hitting the ground, lessening the impact on the driver and the car. For these reasons, winged cars are safer to drive. Often teams are able to replace the wing during the ensuing stoppage and are able to continue once the race resumes.

In 1978, Ted Johnson formed the promotional body for winged sprint cars called the World of Outlaws. Racing throughout the United States from February to November, the World of Outlaws is the premier dirt sprint car racing series. Famous tracks featured in the series included the Eldora Speedway in Rossburg, Ohio, the Lernerville Speedway in Sarver, Pennsylvania, the Knoxville Raceway in Knoxville, Iowa and Williams Grove Speedway in Mechanicsburg, Pennsylvania. Each August, the Knoxville Raceway holds the Knoxville Nationals.

In 1987, Australia followed suit with its own national series for winged sprint cars called the World Series Sprintcars, founded by Adelaide based sedan driver and Speedway Park track promoter John Hughes. Famous Australian tracks used in the WSS have included Speedway Park/City in Adelaide, South Australia, Claremont Speedway and later Perth Motorplex in Perth, Western Australia, Valvoline Raceway in Sydney, New South Wales, Archerfield Speedway in Brisbane, Queensland, and the Premier Speedway (home of the Grand Annual Sprintcar Classic) in Warrnambool, Victoria. There is also a single meeting Australian Sprintcar Championship which has been run since 1963 and has been run under various class names before finally settling on the Australian Sprintcar Championship in 1979. While non-Australian  drivers are free to race in the WSS and other meetings including the various state championships, only Australian drivers are permitted in the Australian Championship meeting.

The Grand Annual Sprintcar Classic at Warrnambool is the largest sprint car meeting in the world; in the 2014–15 season, the 2015 Classic race outdrew the Knoxville Nationals in entries.

Until the early 2000s, sprint cars in Australia were restricted to 6200 cc (372 cui) V8 engines as opposed to the 410 cui (6.7 L) engines used in the United States and New Zealand.  Brian Healey, the Sacramento-based Australian who owned Parramatta City Raceway, pushed for the change in 2003 to follow both nations to 410.  Today, Australia follows the standard 410 ci formula, and has both the 410 and 360 cui (5.9 L) formulae.  Both formulae have separate Australian Championship meetings.

Midget cars 

Midget cars are smaller versions of a full size sprint car, normally non-wing only. Midgets date back to the 1930s as a very common form of sprint car racing, still very popular today and also sanctioned by USAC, POWRI, and others. They are powered by four-cylinder engines developing around 350 horsepower (260 kW), but are only similar to their larger cousins in appearance.

Mini sprint

Mini sprints are similarly sized to midget cars, but have upright-style chassis and center-mounted, chain-driven four-cylinder motorcycle engines with displacements between 750 and 1200 cc.

Micro sprints

Micro sprints are small racecars that are smaller versions of full sprint cars. A starter class for striving sprint car enthusiasts, they run side-mounted 600 cc motorcycle engines developing around 140 hp and are chain driven.  They have chassis and bodies styled like those of full-sized sprint cars or midgets.  Micro sprints are generally run on small dirt tracks that are usually a fifth of a mile or less in size, though they sometimes run on larger tracks.  They can be either raced with wings or without wings; the latter are sometimes called "micro midgets" or "600 cc sprints".  The general minimum weights for the cars to pass tech is 775 lbs for winged and 725 lbs for non wing.  Micro sprints are generally a cheaper alternative than racing mini sprints or midget sprints, but they can be as expensive as full-sized sprint cars.

Outlaw karts 
Outlaw karts are go karts with roll cages and wings. They are some of the cheapest race cars that are very competitive, costing around $5,000. Most tracks are one sixth of a mile or less. Outlaw karts run side-mounted engines of various types. The beginner boxstock and boxstock divisions run pull start clone motors and are usually for the younger drivers first getting their start. The intermediate division run  250 cc dirt bike engines with the drivers or teams having the choice of running a four-stroke or a two-stroke. At some tracks, the intermediate division has to run a harder compound of tire. The biggest division in outlaw karts is the open division. The opens can run 450 cc four strokes, 500 cc two strokes, or 550 cc four-strokes. The 450 cc and 500 cc motors are the more popular options because the 550 cc motors are not run at all tracks, and the tracks that do run them make the kart weigh extra. The weight range for the karts is 150 lb to  500 lb.

Sanctioning bodies

The NOS Energy Drink World of Outlaws (WoO) is a division of 410ci (6.7L) winged sprint cars that run all over the United States and have a few events in Canada. These sprint cars have no batteries or  starters in them, necessitating push starts by a quad or truck. They also do not have flywheels, clutches or transmissions, but the direct drive systems can be engaged or disengaged from the cockpits. This is done both for weight reasons and tradition. Another tradition the WoO has pertaining their "A-main" (the last race of the event) is to have the cars line up four wide just before starting the race as a salute to fans in attendance, giving rise to the popular PA message "you want the best, now you have them four abreast".

The All Star Circuit of Champions (ASCoC) is an American motorsports sanctioning body of winged sprint car racing founded in 1970. The series sanctions 410ci sprint car races in Ohio, Indiana, Pennsylvania, Michigan, Illinois, Wisconsin, New York, and Florida. On average the series runs 40 races per year, starting February and ending in October each year.

The United States Automobile Club (USAC) National Sprint Car Championship is a division of wingless 410 cubic inch sprint cars that run throughout the United States on asphalt and dirt tracks. The USAC also sanctions regional 360ci wingless sprint car series: the USAC East Coast Sprint Cars, USAC Southwest Sprint Cars, and USAC West Coast Sprint Cars.

The United Racing Company (URC) is a division for winged sprint cars that run mainly in the northeastern part of the United States in Pennsylvania, New Jersey, and Delaware. The URC started in 1948 with 11 races in its season. It slowly progressed to 28 races. They race with alcohol fuel and use mechanical fuel injection (MFI) to deliver it into the combustion chamber.

The American Sprint Car Series (ASCS) sanctions both winged and wingless sprint car racing within the United States. ASCS winged cars use a 360 cubic inch engine which lead to fans calling the cars "360s". The series was started by well-known racing promoter Emmett Hahn. The series national headquarters are in Tulsa, Oklahoma. The all-time leader in wins for the series is Texan Gary Wright with 127 A main victories under his belt.  Engine rules for the non-wing cars vary by series with some having unlimited displacement engines.

The International Motor Contest Association (IMCA) was organized in 1915, and is currently the oldest active auto racing sanctioning body in the United States. It sanctions traditional 305 non-winged and winged sprint cars under the IMCA RaceSaver Sprint Car class.

In Australia, sprint car racing is controlled by the Sprintcar Control Council of Australia (SCCA) who sanction the Australian Championships and the World Series Sprintcar series as well as the various state championships and other meetings held around the country.

Wingless sprint car series

Winged sprint car series

Sprint Car World Championship
Despite over 50 years of sprint car racing, the category has only ever held one unofficial "world championship". This was in 1987 at the ⅓ mile Claremont Speedway in Perth, Western Australia. The event attracted a collection of drivers from Australia, NZ, Canada, and South Africa, as well as several World of Outlaws drivers. Australian veteran Garry Rush from Sydney, a 10-time winner of the Australian Sprintcar Championship, was the winner.

Television coverage

United States
Wingless cars were televised first when USAC had an ESPN television contract. The first national live television deal with winged sprint cars came on The Nashville Network (TNN) in 1992–93 and again in 1993–94 with a winter-based series in Arizona, which featured Mike Joy calling the action. Live coverage of the Knoxville Nationals on The Nashville Network began in 1995.  A year later, a next-day tape deal with CBS for one race at Eldora Speedway aired while TNN coverage expanded. By 2000, CBS (which owned TNN at the time) announced TNN would air 15 live events, including the King's Royal at Eldora Speedway and the Knoxville Nationals. By the 2001 season, plans were to cover 18 live races, but midway through the season MTV Networks closed the CBS motorsports operations. This move relegated the remainder of the World of Outlaws season to tape delay races. A tape delayed deal with Speed Channel followed for the next season. Television coverage began on the Outdoor Channel in 2003. Events are usually tape delayed for two weeks or more. The Knoxville Nationals were on Speed Channel. The 2005 Knoxville Nationals did not air as bad weather postponed the event, and there was not enough space for Speed to air the event, won by Kraig Kinser. In 2003, Johnson sold his organization to DIRT Motorsports. Because of complaints about DIRT Motorsports and the lack of television coverage, Northwest Sprint Tour owner Fred Brownfield formed the National Sprint Tour as a rival to the World of Outlaws Sprint for the 2006 season.  Notable teams in the NST included Steve Kinser Racing (No. 11), Roth Motorsports (sometimes known as the "Beef Packers" team) (No. 83), Tony Stewart Racing (No. 20). After Brownfield Promotions' owner Fred Brownfield was killed in a crash, Kinser and principals of two other teams purchased the entire Brownfield promotion. That series folded after the 2006 season, while the Northwest tour, a regional tour, was sold. The SuperClean Summer of Money aired on ESPN2 starting in mid June 2008 with the World of Outlaws at Knoxville Raceway and for eight weeks straight leading up to the Knoxville Nationals which were live on Speed. In 2015, the World of Outlaws had several races broadcast on CBS Sports Network. Knoxville Raceway has their weekly series as well as World of Outlaws and  National Sprint League events on MavTV. USAC currently has some races televised on MavTV, primarily through Jack Slash Media's Dirty 30 highlights program. Other series such as the Lucas Oil ASCS Sprint Car Series, King of the West Sprint Cars, King of the Wing Pavement Sprint Cars, and several weekly regional series on MavTV.

Australia
In Australia, the World Series Sprintcars was formerly televised on free-to-air channel One HD.

Safety aspects

Sprint car racing in recent years has several new mandatory safety regulations including the use of roll cages to protect the drivers, fuel tank bladders to prevent fuel leakage, alcohol fuel, requirements to use a six or seven-point safety harness seatbelt two years old or newer, and driver suit standards to consist of two layers and rated at least SFI 3.2A/5. In addition, drivers must wear nomex driving gloves. Other equipment requirements include: helmets must be full coverage and must exceed Snell 2000 rating; arm restraints systems must be used; cars must have a 1/8 inch wire debris/rock screen in the front roll cage opening covering the entire opening; and headrests mandatory on the right side of the drivers seat.  Some sanctioning bodies are also requiring a head and neck restraint system, as well as full containment seats following the death of Dave Steele at DeSoto Speedway.

Winged sprint cars also have the wing as an additional safety aspect. Winged sprint cars are able to marginally improve their safety with wings that absorb some of the energy from violent flips and crashes, although winged sprint cars generally travel at higher speeds than their non-wing counterparts.

See also
List of National Sprint Car Hall of Fame inductees
Oval Superstars Tour
Australian Sprintcar Grand Prix
Open sportsman
BriSCA Formula 1 Stock Cars: similar formula of short oval auto racing popular in the United Kingdom

References

External links

                                                                     
Official USAC website
Official ASCS website
Official POWRi website
Official WOO website